In regards to copyright on religious works, it is not always clear who the rightsholder is. Under the provisions of the Berne Convention, copyright is granted to the author on the creation of the work. Several religions claim that all or some of their works were authored (written or dictated) by their god or gods.

Religious copyright 
Most countries do not give religion special treatment, either negative or positive, in regards to copyright. Thus, religious works are copyrighted in the same manner as any other type of work.

Since most of the world's major religions have been practiced for over a thousand years, their original scriptures are in public domain. This includes scriptures such as the Torah, the Bible, the Quran, and the Bhagavad Gita. However, most translations of these works are far newer, and translations are often under copyright of the translator. In the United Kingdom, the King James Version of the Bible is covered by crown copyright. Similarly, published versions of these works often include added commentary, and this commentary is under copyright.

For newer religions, scriptures are still copyrighted, and some religious organizations, such as the Church of Scientology, enforce these copyrights aggressively. Older religions often publish newer works to accompany their services, such as hymnals or prayer books, and these are usually copyrighted.

Religions often claim that their works were created by God, higher powers, or divine beings. Works created by such beings are not eligible for copyright and churches can't claim copyrights on their behalf. However, courts have upheld such copyrights under the argument that humans put enough creative work into compiling these divine statements to own a copyright.

Case law

The Urantia Book

In 1991 the Urantia Foundation sued Kristen Maaherra for reproducing parts of The Urantia Book unauthorized. According to the Foundation's representatives, the Papers of The Urantia Book were dictated by celestial, unseen cosmic beings to an unidentified sleeping subject (a human being), and they, The Urantia Foundation, held the copyright in trust of keeping the text "inviolate".  In resolving Urantia Foundation v. Maaherra, the court said that "We agree with [the defendant], however, that it is not creations of divine beings that the copyright laws were intended to protect, and that in this case some element of human creativity must have occurred in order for the Book to be copyrightable. At the very least, for a worldly entity to be guilty of copyright infringement, that entity must have copied something created by another worldly entity."

Maaherra lost the case at this level, on the argument that the members of the receiving group had been given an original direction to the writings by selecting and formulating their questions, thus fulfilling the obligation of creative effort required to gain copyright under U.S. law. This was later overturned on the grounds that the Urantia Foundation was not the author, and that the sleeping subject (a channeler) was legally considered the author, and that the Urantia Foundation thus could not file a valid copyright renewal.

Four years later, in 1999, Harry McMullan III and the Michael Foundation published a book, Jesus–A New Revelation, which included verbatim 76 of the 196 papers included in The Urantia Book. McMullan and the Michael Foundation subsequently sought a legal declaration that the Urantia Foundation's US copyright in The Urantia Book was either invalid or, alternatively, that the copyright had not been infringed upon. Urantia Foundation's copyright was held to have expired in 1983 because the book was deemed to have been neither a composite work nor a commissioned work for hire. These two arguments having been rejected, a U.S. court held that, since the Conduit had deceased prior to 1983, only the Conduit's heirs would have been eligible to renew the copyright in 1983 and, since they had not done so, the Urantia Foundation's copyright on the book had expired and the book had therefore passed into the public domain. This decision was upheld on appeal.

A Course in Miracles

A similar case arose when the copyright owners of A Course in Miracles sued the New Christian Church of Full Endeavor for distributing A Course in Miracles. The court ruled that, even though the church claimed divine authorship, it still held a valid copyright because of the human role in compiling the materials into a cohesive work. The court ruled that the copyright on the manuscripts was violated and wrote, quoting from the above case:"In a case similar to this one, the Ninth Circuit recently held that, notwithstanding a spiritual book's "celestial" or "divine" origins, the originality requirement necessary for a valid copyright was satisfied because the human beings who "compiled, selected, coordinated, and arranged" the book did so "'in such a way that the resulting work as a whole constitutes an original work of authorship.'" Urantia Found. v. Maaherra, 114 F.3d 955, 958 (9th Cir. 1997) ("Urantia") (quoting 17 U.S.C. § 101)."

However, in the final judgment in April 2004, copyright on the published text was not upheld because the earliest versions of ACIM were distributed without a proper copyright notice, which was required under US law at the time.

Church of Scientology

In some cases, copyright law may complicate the performance of religious duties, such as evangelism, where the desire for religious works to be made widely available for the purposes of evangelization may clash with a desire to obtain copyright protection and use it to prohibit the production of unauthorized or altered versions of a text outside of the control of the originating organization.  One prominent example is the case of certain documents, presumably authored by L. Ron Hubbard, which were never intended for public dissemination. Their original purpose was restricted to internal use only.

Since 1994, Scientology has used various legal tactics in an attempt to prevent unauthorized third-party distribution of these works by those outside of the official hierarchy. The church's position is that these documents are intended only for those who have obtained a certain status through religious practice. That status is internally described as being "clear", or having a state of "clearness", due to a person's diligent religious observance.

As a consequence of this belief, the Church of Scientology has sought to obtain legal injunctions against distribution of those documents by any entity other than the Church of Scientology, claiming that such distribution is copyright infringement, as the Church of Scientology considers itself to possess the copyright for such works.

Worldwide Church of God v. Philadelphia Church of God
After the death of Worldwide Church of God founder Herbert W. Armstrong in 1986, church leaders began moving in a different direction, both in tone and teaching. Some members dissatisfied with these moves formed the Philadelphia Church of God, led by Gerald Flurry. By the mid-1990s, much of Armstrong's writings had been repudiated by WCG leadership and were out of print. In 1997, PCG began reprinting many books written by Armstrong and distributed them for free. Flurry and others regarded this material to be central to their religious teaching and practice, requiring their familiarity for any members desiring baptism, especially Mystery of the Ages (Armstrong's last book) and Armstrong's autobiography (recounting his own conversion). WCG sued PCG for copyright infringement, which claimed fair use on religious practice grounds. After a lengthy court battle, WCG won a ruling that,
"...as a matter of law that PCG is not entitled to claim fair use. Because infringement by PCG of WCG's copyright is undisputed, barring fair use, WCG is entitled to a permanent injunction against the reproduction and distribution by PCG of [Mystery of the Ages]. Accordingly, we...dismiss the appeal from the denial of WCG's motion for an injunction pending...and remand for entry of a preliminary injunction pending a trial of any damages and final adjudication."

Despite this victory, Worldwide did not continue the suit, but entered into an out-of-court settlement with Philadelphia. Among the terms of the settlement, PCG purchased the copyrights to Mystery of the Ages and 18 other written works.

See also 
 Church of Spiritual Technology and Religious Technology Center, owner of Scientology and L. Ron Hubbard intellectual property
 Intellectual Reserve, owner of the Church of Jesus Christ of Latter-day Saints' intellectual property

References 

 U.S. 9th Circuit Court of Appeals decision on Urantia Foundation v. Maaherra finding for the Foundation

Religious works, copyright
Religious texts

nl:Auteursrecht op religieuze werken